District 13: Ultimatum, also known as D13-U ( or B13-U), is a 2009 French action thriller film and a sequel to the 2004 film District 13. Directed by Patrick Alessandrin and written and produced by Luc Besson (who also wrote and produced the first film), the film sees parkour artists Cyril Raffaelli and David Belle reprising their original roles of Damien and Leïto.

Plot
Three years after the events of the original film, the authorities are attempting to return law and order to ravaged District 13. However, their efforts so far have failed to do so. The death of gang overlord Taha Ben Mahmoud has left a power vacuum, and total control of the area is now being fought over by five rival territorial gang lords who want to step into Taha's position. Leïto tries demolishing the walls surrounding the district on a daily basis, but is told to stop by African gang lord Molko, who sees the walls as protection from outside the district.

After single-handedly eliminating a major drug dealer, Damien is framed for drug dealing and arrested, but manages to make a brief call to Leïto to come rescue him.

Meanwhile, corrupt government agents from the Department of Internal State Security (DISS), led by Walter Gassman are bent on destroying the five tower blocks at the heart of District 13 with tactical precision bombing, and building luxury flats after the area is cleared. In order to spark conflict with the district's gangs, the DISS shoot two policemen, dump their car in District 13, and prompt several gang members into gunning down the vehicle, making it look like the gang members killed the policemen. The footage of the incident convinces the French President to carry out the strike. However, the DISS were witnessed killing the policemen and filmed by a teenager named Samir and his friends. The DISS agents soon come after the teen to arrest him, but Samir manages to give his memory card to Leïto before being arrested.

Leïto gets himself arrested in order to get into the prison. He then escapes the police and rescues Damien. After freeing Damien from his cell, they discuss the events (deducing that Damien was framed by DISS to keep him from finding out their plans during the crisis) and further plans, resolving to gather enough proof to expose the DISS agents. While Damien distracts the guards, Leïto breaks into Gassman's office to steal his hard-drive for the evidence that they need. Once they escape and return to District 13, Damien and Leïto convince the five gang lords Tao, Molko, Little Montana, Karl the skinhead, and Ali-K to band together and prevent the destruction of the district. While the President struggles with the decision to destroy District 13, even with the area evacuated, a large number of gang members storm the Élysée Palace. They eventually reach the President and show him the information that they acquired, proving Gassman is a corrupt DISS agent. Gassman then takes the President hostage and tries to force him to approve the mass demolition. Leïto, Damien, and the gang lords succeed in freeing the President and incapacitating Gassman, earning the President's thanks and a promise to fund District 13's restoration.

With the conflict over and District 13 completely evacuated, the gang lords then decide that it would be better to rebuild District 13 anew rather than try to patch up its remnants. The movie ends with the President authorizing the strike, the District 13 buildings exploding and the president breathing a sigh of relief, stating that he needs a drink.

In a post-credits scene, a short clip shows the President, the gang lords, Damien and Leïto all joking around and smoking cigars together.

Cast
 David Belle as Leïto
 Cyril Raffaelli as Damien Tomaso
 Philippe Torreton as President
 Daniel Duval as Walter Gassman
 Élodie Yung as Tao, leader of the Asian gang
  as Molko, leader of the African gang
 Fabrice Feltzinger as Little Montana, leader of the Gypsy gang
  as Karl, leader of the Skinhead gang
 La Fouine as Ali-K, leader of the Arab gang
  as Roland
  as Sonya
 Jean-François Lénogue as Jeff
 Lannick Gautry as the cool friend
  as the mute secretary
 Emilien De Falco as Police Officer (uncredited)

Reception
On review aggregator website Rotten Tomatoes, the film holds an approval rating of 74% based on 74 reviews, and an average rating of 6.1/10. The website's critical consensus reads, "District 13 bites off more than it can chew with its political subtext and questionable script, but the many action sequences are never less than entertaining." On Metacritic, the film has a weighted average score of 64 out of 100, based on 19 critics, indicating "generally favorable reviews".

Releases
The original French-language version of District B13: Ultimatum was released in France on 18 February 2009. The English-language version of the film was released in the United Kingdom on 29 October 2009, and it premiered in the United States in a free screening in New York on 28 January 2010.

The film was released on DVD and Blu-ray in France on 19 August 2009. The Region 1 version was released on 27 April 2010.

References

External links 
 
 District 13: Ultimatum at Rotten Tomatoes
 

District 13 films
2009 films
2009 action thriller films
EuropaCorp films
Films about organized crime in France
Hood films
Films directed by Patrick Alessandrin
Films produced by Luc Besson
Films set in the future
Films shot in Belgrade
Films shot in Paris
Films shot in Serbia
French action thriller films
2000s French-language films
French sequel films
Martial arts films
Parkour in film
2000s American films
2000s French films